Scott Dewitt Stephen (born June 18, 1964 in Los Angeles, California) is a former American football linebacker in the National Football League. He was drafted by the Green Bay Packers in the third round of the 1987 NFL Draft. He played college football at Arizona State.

Stephen also played for the Los Angeles Rams.

External links
Pro Football Reference bio

1964 births
Living people
Players of American football from Los Angeles
American football linebackers
Arizona State Sun Devils football players
Green Bay Packers players
Los Angeles Rams players